Wenduine is a seaside resort on the Belgian North Sea coast. It is a village with a population of 4000 inhabitants in the West-Flemish municipality of De Haan.

Wenduine is served by the Kusttram (Coastal tram) which traverses the entire Belgian coast.

Images

External links
Website D'n Oane-Wendune

Populated places in West Flanders
Seaside resorts in Belgium
De Haan, Belgium